Zé Ramalho Canta Jackson do Pandeiro is the fourth tribute album by Brazilian solo artist Zé Ramalho, the third consecutive one. This time, he pays a tribute to his influence Jackson do Pandeiro.

Track listing

Personnel 
 Zé Ramalho  – acoustic guitar on tracks 1, 2, 4, 8, 10, 11, 12, lead vocals on all tracks, viola on track 7
 Waldonys – lead vocals on track 7

References 

 Album at Ramalho's official website

2010 albums
Zé Ramalho albums
Jackson do Pandeiro tribute albums